Ahmad Saber Hamcho (born 25 November 1992) is a Syrian equestrian who competed in individual jumping at the 2012 Summer Olympics. He was the first Syrian to participate in Olympic equestrian events. In December 2019, he qualified for the 2020 Summer Olympics in Tokyo. He won two gold medals at the 2022 Mediterranean Games.

Personal life
Hamcho declared his strong support for Bashar al-Assad during the 2012 Summer Olympics in London. He is a relative of Mohammad Hamcho who is included in the list of individuals sanctioned by the European Union and United States in 2011.

References

External links

 
 
 
 

1992 births
Living people
Syrian male equestrians
Olympic equestrians of Syria
Equestrians at the 2012 Summer Olympics
Equestrians at the 2020 Summer Olympics
Asian Games competitors for Syria
Equestrians at the 2006 Asian Games
Equestrians at the 2010 Asian Games
Equestrians at the 2018 Asian Games
Sportspeople from Damascus
Mediterranean Games gold medalists for Syria
Mediterranean Games medalists in equestrian
Competitors at the 2022 Mediterranean Games
21st-century Syrian people